The 1874 Haverfordwest by-election was fought on 12 June 1874.  The byelection was fought due to the voiding of the election of the incumbent Liberal MP, The Lord Kensington.  It was retained by the incumbent who ran unopposed.

Results

See also
Lists of United Kingdom by-elections

References

1874 in Wales
1870s elections in Wales
1874 elections in the United Kingdom
By-elections to the Parliament of the United Kingdom in Welsh constituencies
Unopposed by-elections to the Parliament of the United Kingdom in Welsh constituencies